Manel Balastegui Riguillo (born 30 November 1999) is a Spanish rower. He competed in the 2020 Summer Olympics.

References

External links
 
 
 
 

1999 births
Living people
Rowers at the 2020 Summer Olympics
Spanish male rowers
Olympic rowers of Spain